The Naval Dockyards Society was founded in 1997 with the objectives of increasing public awareness of historic dockyards and related sites and activities; increasing access to historic dockyards and related sites; monitoring proposed developments at such sites; creating links with related bodies in Britain and abroad; coordinating, promoting and publishing new research; offering assistance to those establishing dockyard heritage sites and acting as an international forum for those interested in these themes.

The Society is concerned with, and publishes material on: naval dockyards and associated activities, including victualling, medicine, ordnance, shipbuilding, shipbreaking, provisions and supplies; all aspects of their construction, history, archaeology, conservation, workforce, surrounding communities and family history; all aspects of their buildings, structures and monuments relating to naval history. The Society is therefore involved closely in the terrestrial and underwater heritage of all these sites.

The NDS has links with many other societies interested in maritime history such as the Navy Records Society; The Society for Nautical Research; The Naval Historical Collectors & Research Association; South West Maritime History Society; The Nelson Society; The 1805 Club; Newcomen Society; The Nautical Archaeology Society and The Royal Geographical Society. The Society is supported by The National Maritime Museum in Greenwich.

References

External links
  Naval Dockyards Society

Maritime history organizations
1997 establishments in the United Kingdom
Organizations established in 1997